is a Japanese boxer. He competed in the men's featherweight event at the 1988 Summer Olympics.

References

1966 births
Living people
Japanese male boxers
Olympic boxers of Japan
Boxers at the 1988 Summer Olympics
Place of birth missing (living people)
Featherweight boxers